Aspidolasius is a genus of South American orb-weaver spiders containing the single species, Aspidolasius branicki. It was first described by Eugène Simon in 1887, and has been found in Colombia, Bolivia, Guyana, and Brazil.

References

Araneidae
Monotypic Araneomorphae genera
Spiders of South America
Taxa named by Eugène Simon